Robert Borden Reams (January 27, 1904 – March 26, 1994) was an American diplomat. He was the first United States Ambassador to Upper Volta (now Burkina Faso), Dahomey (now Benin), Niger, and Ivory Coast (now Côte d'Ivoire) simultaneously. On July 31, 1960, an envoy, Donald R. Norland, had presented his credentials as Chargé d'Affaires ad interim on the previous day of Reams' appointment.

Biography
Reams was born in Luthersburg, Clearfield County, Pennsylvania, on January 27, 1904. He was the son of John Homer Reams and Lulu Ann (Borden) Reams. He married Charlotte Johns on April 6, 1924, divorced her in 1947 and married Dorothy Yovich that same year. He later joined the U.S Foreign and saw overseas post as U.S. Vice Consul in Le Havre, France from 1929 to 1931, South Africa in Johannesburg from 1931 to 33 and again from 1935 to 1936; From 1933 to 1935 Reams was U.S. Vice Consul in Port Elizabeth, South Africa. He later became U.S. Consul in Copenhagen, Denmark in 1937 until 1940.

Reams served as the specialist on Jewish issues for the State Department's Division of European Affairs during World War II. In the role he downplayed reports of Nazi exterminations of Jews in Europe, casting doubts on diplomatic cables that sought to notify the United Nations and raise alarm. Reams concluded the reports of mass deportation and murder were accurate, but wrote in 1942 that if the State Department corroborated such information, it would have exposed governments to "increased pressure... to do something."  

Reams similarly resisted efforts in 1943 to potentially rescue Jews in Europe facing deportation and extermination. Reams wrote there was a "danger" that the German Government might agree to release Jewish refugees to the U.S., and that to care for such refugees would be an "onus" on the United Nations. Between 1942 and 1944, Reams and his colleagues in the State Department resisted all efforts to save European Jews. Randolph Paul of the Treasury Department described Reams and his colleagues as an "underground movement... to let the Jews be killed." 

On October 14, 1960, Reams was nominated to be the U.S. Ambassador to Dahomey, Niger, Ivory Coast, and Upper Volta by President Dwight D. Eisenhower. He was a resident at Abidjan during his ambassadorship. By 1962, Reams had been superseded by respective ambassadors to each country he represented.

Reams died from an aortic aneurysm on March 26, 1994, at the age of 90.

References

1904 births
1994 deaths
Ambassadors of the United States to Burkina Faso
Ambassadors of the United States to Benin
Ambassadors of the United States to Niger
Ambassadors of the United States to Ivory Coast
United States Foreign Service personnel
American expatriates in South Africa
American expatriates in Denmark